Curuguaty (originally called Villa de San Isidro Labrador de los Reyes Católicos de Curuguaty) is a city and a district in the Canindeyú Department of Paraguay, that was the 4th and last capital of Paraguay during the Paraguayan War in 1869–1870.

Toponimy

The meaning of the word “Curuguaty” is “place of the Curugua”, curugua (Latin: Cucurbita odorifera) being a plant very common in the area.

Geography
Canindeyú Department has a richness in flora and is surrounded by the Mbaracayú Mountains, which have an average altitude of 400 meters above ocean level. It is possible, in this place, to appreciate the biological diversity of the Atlantic Forest, Spanish: Mata atlántica.

Climate
In summer, the temperature reaches 39 °C and in winter drops to 0 °C. The average in the entire department is 21 °C. The precipitations are very frequent and abundant.

Demographics
The city counts with a population of 65.310 inhabitants, 34.137 are men and 31.172 are women, according to the projections of the Statistics, Polls and Census General Direction. A great number of the inhabitants are originating from neighbouring Brazil.

History
Curuguaty was found on May 15, 1712, by Juan Gregorio de Bazán y Pedraza, with the name of “Villa de San Isidro Labrador de los Reyes Católicos de Curuguaty”, on the banks of the Curuguaty River.

In this city lived during the government of Dr. Francia, the founder and first dictator of Paraguay, in his exile for over 30 years, José Gervasio Artigas, the liberator of Uruguay. During the War against the Triple Alliance, the Marshall López declared Curuguaty as his last and the 4th capital of Paraguay and the Vice-President Domingo Francisco Sánchez Corvalán settled in the place. López settled his troops near Curuguaty on the banks of the Itandey Stream, when he was going towards the Amambay Cordillera, where the last battles would be fought during the war.

Since the early years of the new millennium landless peasants fight for their land, which was in part at least given in the past decades to influential and wealthy men and women of the political upper classes of Paraguay. The last clashes occurred in June 2012 and cost the lives of at least eleven peasants and six policemen.

Personalities
A martyr of the Paraguayan Independence, Mauricio José Troche, is a native of Curuguaty.

How to get there
Curuguaty is located 240 kilometers from Asunción; the way of access is through Route No. III “Gral. Elizardo Aquino” and through Route No. X “Las Residentas”, which communicates the departments’ capital with Asunción. Also, the superhighway of Itaipu, communicates the city with Alto Paraná and Presidente Franco.

Reaching the city, a not paved detour to the left leads to Villa Ygatimí, Ypehú, Itanará and the Mbaracayú Forest National Reserve.

References 

 Geografía Ilustrada del Paraguay, Distribuidora Arami SRL; 2007. .
 Geografía del Paraguay, Primera Edición 1999, Editorial Hispana Paraguay SRL.

External links
 About the violence in July 2012
  SENATUR

Populated places in the Canindeyú Department
Populated places established in 1712